Some Mother's Son is a 1996 film written and directed by Irish filmmaker Terry George, co-written by Jim Sheridan, and based on the true story of the 1981 hunger strike in the Maze Prison, in Northern Ireland.  Provisional Irish Republican Army (IRA) prisoner Bobby Sands (played by John Lynch) led a protest against the treatment of IRA prisoners, claiming that they should be treated as prisoners of war rather than criminals. The mothers of two of the strikers, played by Helen Mirren and Fionnula Flanagan, fight to save their sons' lives. When the prisoners go on hunger strike and become incapacitated, the mothers must decide whether to abide by their sons' wishes, or to go against them and have them forcibly fed.

Helen Mirren and John Lynch had already acted together in the 1984 Troubles-related film Cal.

The film was screened in the Un Certain Regard section at the 1996 Cannes Film Festival.

Cast
 Helen Mirren as Kathleen Quigley
 Fionnula Flanagan as Annie Higgins
 Aidan Gillen as Gerard Quigley
 David O'Hara as Frank Higgins
 John Lynch as Bobby Sands
 Tom Hollander as Farnsworth
 Tim Woodward as Harrington
 Ciarán Hinds as Danny Boyle
 Geraldine O'Rawe as Alice Quigley
 Gerard McSorley as Father Daly
 Dan Gordon as Inspector McPeake
 Grainne Delany as Theresa Higgins
 Ciarán Fitzgerald as Liam Quigley
 Robert Lang as Government Minister
 Oliver Maguire as Frank Maguire
 Stephen Hogan as Young Turk
 Myles Walsh as Man at Church door

References

External links

1996 films
Films based on actual events
Films set in Belfast
Films about The Troubles (Northern Ireland)
Films about the Irish Republican Army
English-language Irish films
Irish-language films
Political drama films
Castle Rock Entertainment films
Columbia Pictures films
Films directed by Terry George
1996 drama films
European Film Awards winners (films)
1981 Irish hunger strike
1996 directorial debut films
Films about mother–son relationships
1990s English-language films